Grand Canyon University  (GCU) is a private for-profit Christian university in Phoenix, Arizona. Based on student enrollment, Grand Canyon University was the largest Christian university in the world in 2018, with 20,000 attending students on campus and 70,000 online.

Grand Canyon was established by the Arizona Southern Baptist Convention on August 1, 1949, in Prescott, Arizona, as Grand Canyon College. In 1999–2000, the university ended its affiliation with the Southern Baptist Convention. Suffering financial and other difficulties in the early part of the 21st century, the school's trustees authorized its sale in January 2004 to California-based Significant Education, LLC, making it the first for-profit Christian college in the United States. Following that purchase, the university became the first and only for-profit to participate in NCAA Division I athletics. In 2018 the university received approval to return to non-profit status from its regional accreditor as well as the IRS and the Arizona State Board for Private Postsecondary Education. However, the U.S. Department of Education rejected the university's request to reclassify it as a non-profit and continues to classify the university as for-profit. The university operations partner directly alongside the for-profit publicly traded online program management corporation, Grand Canyon Education, Inc. (formerly Significant Education) that bundles services for the university to operate. The university president, Brian Mueller, also serves as the CEO of Grand Canyon Education.

The university offers various programs through its nine colleges including doctoral studies, business, education, fine arts and production, humanities and social sciences, nursing and health care professions, science, theology, and engineering and technology.

History

Founding

Grand Canyon College was founded as a nonprofit institution in 1949 in Prescott, Arizona. Southern Baptists felt the need to establish a faith-based institution that would allow local Baptists the opportunity to obtain a bachelor's or master's degree without going east to one of the Baptist colleges in Texas or Oklahoma. On October 8, 1951, Grand Canyon College relocated to its current location in Phoenix. In 1984, the college's trustees voted to transition the college to a university for the 40th anniversary of the school in 1989, becoming Grand Canyon University. At this time, it also changed governance from the Southern Baptist Convention to the GCU Board of Trustees.

Restructuring/conversion to for-profit
Suffering financial and other difficulties in the early part of the 21st century, the school's trustees authorized its sale in January 2004 to California-based Significant Education, LLC, making it the first for-profit Christian college in the United States. Significant Education was a subsidiary of education entrepreneur Michael K. Clifford's company. Clifford became managing director of the privatized institution, with the former board of trustees serving in an advisory role. Significant Education changed to a corporation in 2005 and became publicly traded under a new name Grand Canyon Education, Inc in 2008. It trades on NASDAQ under the ticker symbol "LOPE."

After the infusion of capital, Grand Canyon University's size increased. After having fewer than 1,000 students enrolled in 2008, the university had 17,500 students in the spring of 2017. A 2015 economic impact study revealed that the university was adding about $1 billion into the state's economy each year during its expansion. In February 2017, Arizona Governor Doug Ducey said that the neighborhoods surrounding the university have experienced a 30% increase in housing values while concurrently seeing a 30% decrease in crime rates.

In 2008, the university was sued by the United States federal government for paying enrollment counselors according to how many students they had enrolled while at the same time accepting federal financial aid, a violation of the Department of Education's incentive compensation ban. GCU eventually reached a settlement in the case, and was forced to pay a $5.2 million fine to a former employee and the federal government.

By 2014 the accumulated student loan debt of Grand Canyon students was estimated to be more than $5.9 billion.

ASU eventually reversed its decision, and sporting events between the two universities recommenced in the fall of 2020.

Attempts to return to non-profit status
In fall 2014, the college announced the exploration of a return to non-profit status. Grand Canyon's regional accreditation body, the Higher Learning Commission (HLC), rejected the university's petition for conversion to non-profit status in 2016, stating that the school's proposed strategy, particularly its plan to outsource some of its activities (such as curriculum development and student support services) to outside vendors, did not meet the criteria for "such a conversion".  In 2018, the university submitted another application to HLC to change to non-profit status. This second application was accepted on July 1, 2018. Although some organizations have approved this transition, the U.S. Department of Education still classifies the university as a for-profit university. The government specifically stated that GCU is a captive client to Grand Canyon Education and the college is operating for the benefit of shareholders of a for-profit company. Grand Canyon Education has also been accused of engaging in securities-law fraud with its relation to GCU.

Grand Canyon University was alleged to switch from for-profit status to non-profit status due to its yearly $9.2 million property tax bill. Numerous school officials said this was unsustainable and was one of the key reasons a required switch from for-profit to non-profit status was made, to reduce that burden. Some critics of for-profit education criticized the relationship between GCU and Grand Canyon Education, Inc. as being too intertwined.

In 2021, a federal judge dismissed a lawsuit by GCU that claimed the university didn't receive all the coronavirus relief funds to which it was entitled because it was a non-profit entity. That same year, GCU filed a lawsuit against the US Department of Education after being denied non-profit status twice. The lawsuit was dismissed in 2022 after a federal judge rejected the university's claims.

Campuses
In 2006, the college spent USD $150 million to renovate the campus, adding a brick promenade, an aquatics center and a café.

In 2009, Grand Canyon University's campus began work on a USD $60 million campus expansion project which includes a 500-bed dormitory, a  fitness and recreation center, 125-classroom facility, food court and bowling alley, and a 5000-seat arena. The GCU Arena, which opened on September 2, 2011, is used for concerts, speakers, and other events. The arena is also home to the college's men's and women's basketball teams and women's volleyball games. The arena was expanded to 7,000 seats with construction beginning in spring 2014 and concluding in August of the same year. Grand Canyon University offers several fast food restaurants, coffee shops, student union, cafeteria, video game room, and six-lane bowling alley for student recreation. In August 2016, the university announced it was establishing a campus police department, converting its Public Safety Department, a 177-member force.

In August 2016, GCU announced its 10 in 2 initiative, the building of 10 on-campus athletic facilities in a two-year span. Highlights of the project included new facilities for the university's soccer, baseball, softball, tennis and beach volleyball programs. It also included a sports medicine expansion, an equipment room expansion, practice facilities for the basketball and golf programs, and a student-athlete academic center.

In August 2017, Grand Canyon's Phoenix campus was ranked as one of the 10 Best College Campuses Across America by Town & Country.

Academics
Grand Canyon University offers over 200 bachelor's, master's and doctoral degree programs through its nine colleges.
 College of Business
 College of Education
 College of Fine Arts and Production
 College of Humanities, Social Sciences
 College of Nursing and Health Care Professions
 College of Science, Engineering, and Technology
 College of Theology
 College of Doctoral Studies
 GCU Honors College

In August 2016, the university announced that it was opening a seminary.

In April 2017, Arizona nursing board officials censured GCU after the school's nursing programs fell below 80% graduation rate for two consecutive years. GCU said it would implement a plan to increase graduation rates. Three months later, the nursing board announced it was pleased with the "tremendous improvements" the university had shown to addressing all concerns. In 2018, Grand Canyon's nursing program was censured by the Arizona State Board of Nursing over test passage rates. The censure came due to the number of first-time students failing to pass the registered nursing exam and after numerous complaints by students and faculty. In the second quarter of 2018, Grand Canyon University's nursing students posted a 95.65 percent first-time pass rate on the National Council Licensure Examination (NCLEX). This leads to a year-to-date rate of 92.86 percent, which is higher than the Arizona Board of Nursing's year-to-date statewide average of 91.89.

Grand Canyon University's academic workers include 335 full-time workers and more than 4,200 adjunct faculty.

Grand Canyon University's undergraduate entrance requirements are either a 3.0 high school GPA, or a high school GPA of 2.5 with either an SAT score of 1,000 or ACT score of 19. In 2021, the university acceptance rate was 76.9%; of those admitted, 23% enrolled. The university does not report scores of matriculating students, while high school class rank, high school college preparatory classes, and letters of recommendation are neither required nor recommended.

Athletics

Grand Canyon University is a member of NCAA Division I with most sports participating in the Western Athletic Conference. Grand Canyon's reclassification to Division I status in athletics started in the academic year 2013–14. Men's Volleyball competes in the Mountain Pacific Sports Federation and Beach Volleyball competes independently.

In March 2013, former Phoenix Suns shooting guard Dan Majerle became the 13th men's basketball coach. Majerle oversaw GCU's transition into NCAA Division I basketball in the WAC.

On August 23, 2017, the NCAA approved Grand Canyon's move to Division I, elevating the university to active membership status and making it Division I basketball's only for-profit institution. GCU immediately became eligible for post-season competition.

In March 2020, Majerle was fired after seven seasons as head coach to GCU's men's basketball team. In May 2020, Majerle sued the university for breach of contract, alleging that the university did not give reason to terminate him or make any severance payments. The lawsuit was dismissed the following year with an unclear resolution.

Rankings, recognition, statistics, and accreditation

Grand Canyon University is accredited by the Higher Learning Commission (HLC). According to the HLC, Grand Canyon College entered candidacy for accreditation in 1961. By 1968 the school was regionally accredited by the North Central Association of Colleges and Schools, HLC's predecessor, and remains accredited, successfully renewing its 10-year comprehensive evaluation in 2017. GCU colleges and programs also holds additional accreditations from the Accreditation Council for Business Schools and Programs (ACBSP), the Commission on Collegiate Nursing Education (CCNE), the Arizona State Board of Educations, and the Commission on Accreditation of Athletic Training Education (CAATE). The university teachers and administrator preparation programs are approved by the Arizona Department of Education.

In 2021, the university acceptance rate was 76.9% and, of those admitted, 23% enrolled. The freshman retention rate was 61%. U.S. News & World Report classifies the university among "National Universities", wherein it was classified in the 2022 Best Colleges as a Tier 2 institution (meaning it is placed in the bottom 25 percent of institutions in its ranking category).

Notable alumni
 Anthony Birchak, wrestler;  MMA fighter
 Henry Cejudo, MMA fighter, Ultimate Fighting Championship
 Bill Engvall, comedian
 Efrain Escudero, wrestler; MMA fighter, TUF 8 winner
 Bayard Forrest, professional basketball player
 Christine Weidinger, American operatic soprano
 Grandy Glaze, St Johns Edge Canadian League Basketball
 Steven Green, Christian music singer
 Niki Jackson, Major League Soccer player
 Killian Larson, professional basketball player
 Horacio Llamas, professional basketball player
 Randy McCament, professional baseball player
 Josh McDermitt, American film and television actor and comedian
 Moriah Peters, singer-songwriter
 James L. Pharr, fire marshall and professor of fire safety and engineering technology
 Cody Ransom, professional baseball player
 Tim Salmon, professional baseball player
 Randy Soderman, professional soccer player
 Rachel Mitchell, sex crimes prosecutor and Maricopa County attorney who interviewed Justice Brett Kavanaugh and Christine Blasey Ford
 David Stapleton, professional baseball player
 Kevin Warren, COO of the Minnesota Vikings and commissioner of Big Ten Conference
 James White, reformed theologian; apologist; director of Alpha and Omega Ministries

References

 
Educational institutions established in 1949
Companies listed on the Nasdaq
1949 establishments in Arizona
Private universities and colleges in Arizona
Universities and colleges in Phoenix, Arizona
For-profit universities and colleges in the United States